Josef Hasenöhrl (5 May 1915 – 13 March 1945 in Schöndorf (an der Ruwer)) was an Austrian rower who competed in the 1936 Summer Olympics. He was killed in action in World War II.

Hasenöhrl was a sculler with Ruderverein Ellida, Vienna. In 1936 he won the silver medal in the single sculls competition rowing at the 1936 Summer Olympics. In 1937 he won the Diamond Challenge Sculls at Henley Royal Regatta beating J F Coulson in the final. His coach was Tom Sullivan.

Hasenöhrl was serving as a lieutenant with the Wehrmacht when he lost his life on the Western Front (World War II) at the end of the Second World War.

He is buried at Sandweiler (Block P, Grab 214).

References

External links

 Database Olympics profile
 photo

1915 births
1945 deaths
Austrian male rowers
Olympic rowers of Austria
Rowers at the 1936 Summer Olympics
Olympic silver medalists for Austria
German Army personnel killed in World War II
Olympic medalists in rowing
Medalists at the 1936 Summer Olympics
European Rowing Championships medalists
German Army officers of World War II